An ATM Adaptation layer 1 or AAL1 is used for transmitting Class A network traffic, that is, real-time, constant bit rate, connection oriented traffic (example- uncompressed audio and video). Bits are fed in by the application at constant rate and must be delivered to other end with minimum delay, jitter or overhead. The input is stream of bits without message boundaries. For this traffic, error detection protocols cannot be used since timeouts and retransmission causes delay but the missing cells are reported to the application, that must take its own action to recover from them.

Network protocols